Emmanuel Ilesanmi (born 17 November 2004) is an English footballer who plays for Scarborough, on loan from Harrogate Town, as a forward.

Career
Ilesanmi is a graduate of the Harrogate Town Academy, and in making his first-team debut on 5 October 2021 in the EFL Trophy, became the first Academy graduate to play for the first-team. He moved on loan to Scarborough in January 2023.

References

2004 births
Living people
English footballers
Harrogate Town A.F.C. players
Scarborough F.C. players
English Football League players
Association football forwards
Black British sportspeople